This is a discography of the German electro house duo Digitalism.

Discography

Studio albums

Compilations

Extended plays

Singles

Remixes

References

Digitalism (band) albums
Discographies of German artists